Ross Matthews (born 23 January 1996) is a Scottish footballer playing for Raith Rovers in Scotland.

Career
Born in Edinburgh, Matthews began his career with Edinburgh City and Royston Rangers boys club before being quickly swooped up by Heart of Midlothian. He began his professional career at Raith Rovers. He was first included in a matchday squad on 10 August 2013, remaining an unused substitute in a 0–1 home defeat to Hamilton Academical in the first game of the Scottish Championship season. On 28 December, he made his debut and only appearance of the season, replacing Calum Elliot for the final seven minutes of a 3–0 loss at Livingston.
Matthews has been regular in the first team squad for the 2015–16 season and made his first start in the 3rd round tie of the League Cup loss to Celtic at Celtic Park. After the match, he was praised by manager Ray Mckinnon for an outstanding dominant performance in the middle of the park.

In the beginning of the 2016/17 season for rovers, Matthews has been a regular within the first team squad under new head coach Gary Locke, moving from his natural central midfield position, into the right midfield role. On 6 August, Mathews netted his first goal for the club and the 2nd of the match, during a 2–0 away win over Ayr United.

Career statistics

Honours
 Raith Rovers
 Scottish League One : 2019-20
Scottish Challenge Cup : 2021-22

References

External links
 

1996 births
Living people
Footballers from Edinburgh
Scottish footballers
Association football midfielders
Raith Rovers F.C. players
Scottish Professional Football League players